Kerry Bentivolio  (born October 6, 1951) is an American politician and educator who is the former United States Representative for , in office from 2013 to 2015.  Bentivolio, a Republican, defeated Democratic nominee Syed Taj, a physician, in the November 6, 2012 election. Bentivolio was defeated for the Republican nomination in his bid for a second term by attorney David Trott. He launched a write-in campaign for the November 2014 general election but lost again to Trott. After Trott announced he was not seeking reelection in 2018, Bentivolio again sought election in the eleventh district, but finished last in the primary. In October 2019, Bentivolio announced that he would again run for his former congressional seat against Democrat Haley Stevens.

Bentivolio worked as a designer in the automotive industry for twenty years, followed by teaching for fifteen years in schools and institutions. He is an Army veteran who served in the Vietnam War, the Gulf War, and the Iraq War.

Early life and education
Bentivolio was born in Detroit, Michigan in 1951. Bentivolio was raised in the Detroit area with four brothers. His father, a factory worker, served in World War II, while his grandfather served in World War I.  He attended Oakland Community College from 1971 to 1983 where he earned an associate degree in Liberal Arts. He received his Bachelor of Arts in Social Science from Saint Mary's College in Michigan in 1999.  He transferred to Michigan State University in East Lansing to attend further courses in 1975 and met his future wife, Karen.  Later, he earned a master's degree in Education from Marygrove College in 2001.

Military service
Bentivolio enlisted in the United States Army in November 1968 and served in South Vietnam from 1970 to 1971 as an infantry rifleman. After a break in service, he later joined the Army National Guard in Michigan as a reservist and served for more than 20 years. Bentivolio was trained as an MLRS/HIMARS crewmember. He was deployed to Iraq in 2007 with an Artillery unit as a senior human resources sergeant performing combat convoy missions. He retired as a sergeant first class after a neck injury in 2008. Bentivolio's awards include the Meritorious Service Medal, Army Commendation Medal, Army Achievement Medal, and the Combat Infantryman Badge.

Civilian career
Bentiviolio has worked as an autoworker, reindeer rancher, automotive designer, teacher, commercial home builder, Santa Claus for hire, and amateur actor before running for political office.  He taught in private schools, public schools, and adult education institutions.

Bentivolio said he took up acting in movies to get rid of his stage fright in front of cameras.  In 2010, he acted in the low budget movie Lucy's Law in the role of a TV News reporter.  In 2011, he appeared in another low budget political satire, The President Goes to Heaven.

Political career

2010 state senate election
In 2010, Bentivolio ran for the Michigan Senate for the 15th District but was defeated by Mike Kowall in the primary.  During the election, Bentivolio acknowledged that he had filed for bankruptcy in 1992 after homes he had built as a commercial builder did not sell, and Bentivolio faced judgments from creditor's collection suits in the Michigan counties of Oakland and Livingston.  Bentivolio also acknowledged having been involved in a lawsuit involving one of the creditors to whom he had owed money at that time; Bentivolio had started a new business doing Santa Claus appearances, and had obtained an appearance at the White House during the presidency of George H. W. Bush. Bentivolio called a news conference in Milford, whereupon the creditor complained and newspapers reported on the bankruptcy story. Bentivolio sued the vendor and several newspapers for slander and libel.
He won the case against his for slander and libel and was awarded $100,000.
The Free Press newspaper settled out of court.

2012 congressional elections

In 2011, Bentivolio announced his candidacy for Michigan's 11th congressional district seat in the U.S. House of Representatives and was considered a long-shot to defeat incumbent Thaddeus McCotter for the Republican nomination. However, Bentivolio's campaign was aided by reports that McCotter failed to qualify for the primary after failing to turn in enough valid petition signatures to qualify for the ballot. McCotter's campaign released a statement on May 25, 2012, conceding that there were not enough valid signatures turned in with his ballot petition.

Although McCotter initially announced he would mount a write-in campaign for the seat, he opted to retire at the end of his term. However, McCotter unexpectedly resigned on July 6, 2012, causing a scramble for the vacant nomination.  Bentivolio faced former state senator Nancy Cassis, a write-in candidate, for the district's Republican primary.  Cassis and her supporters drew attention to the 2011 film The President Goes to Heaven in which Bentivolio had a prominent role as a doctor tending to a fictional president resembling George W. Bush.  In the movie, a fictional president instigates the September 11, 2001 attacks in a plot to justify the invasion of Iraq, but cannot get to heaven until he converts to Islam.  Bentivolio pointed out the film was a work of fiction.  On August 7, 2012, Bentivolio defeated Cassis and won the district's Republican nomination, pitting him against Democratic nominee Syed Taj, a physician, in the November 6, 2012 election.

In August 2012, news reports stated that Bentivoio had been reprimanded for threatening students at Fowlerville High School. Bentivolio said the allegations were false and politically motivated. On November 1, 2012, five days before the general election, Phillip Bentivolio of Little Rock, Arkansas, the estranged brother of Bentivolio, told the Michigan Information and Research Service (MIRS) that his brother owed him $20,000 for houses they built together in Arkansas 20 years earlier.  Phillip also accused his brother of being "mentally imbalanced" and "dishonest".  Bentivolio responded by telling MIRS that his brother called for the first time in 20 years and threatened to go to the press if Bentivolio didn't pay him $20,000.   He said he became worried about Phillip's mental state and reported him to the Little Rock Police Department, which confirmed that officers visited and checked on Phillip's condition.

On November 6, 2012, Bentivolio lost the special election for the remaining months of McCotter's term in 112th Congress to David Curson, but won the general election and became representative-elect for the 11th Congressional District.

2014 congressional election
Bentivolio faced an August 5, 2014, Republican primary challenge for the Michigan's 11th congressional district seat from lawyer David Trott who announced his bid on September 4, 2013. He was defeated by Trott in the primary, making him the third incumbent defeated in a Republican primary in 2014. He served out the rest of his term. However, Bentivolio mounted what The Hill described as a lackluster write-in campaign for the November 2014 election to continue serving in his seat.

Bentivolio finished the general election behind Trott, Democratic challenger, Bobby McKenzie, and Libertarian candidate John Tatar, and relinquished his seat in January.

A May 20–22 poll of likely Republican primary voters run by Target Insyght and commissioned by MIRS (Michigan Information & Research Service, Inc.) showed Rep. Bentivolio leading Trott 33% to 21%. The poll also showed a significant unfavorability rating for Trott among the Republicans surveyed.

A July 12–13 poll commissioned by the Detroit Free Press and WXYZ-TV indicated that Bentivolio's support had dropped considerably in the face of a strong media barrage from the Trott campaign; Trott led in the poll of likely Republican primary voters 53%–31%, with 16% undecided.

In the Republican primary, Trott defeated Bentivolio by 42,008 votes (66.4%) to 21,254 (33.6%).

After his defeat, Bentivolio announced that he was running a write-in campaign. He alleged that after Trott won the primary, the Trott campaign "kept up the attacks, but they expanded it beyond me. After they won the race, they continued to beat up me, my family members, as well as my staff... I put them on notice: If they didn't stop I'm probably going to end up doing a write-in campaign. And they didn't stop." The Trott campaign has denied this, saying that "nothing like that occurred." Bentivolio does not think he will win, or even "get enough votes to keep [Trott] from getting elected... all I'm concerned about is getting people who want a voice through a protest vote to do a protest vote."

2016 congressional election
Bentivolio originally sought to run for Congress in 2016 as a Republican again, however he abandoned these plans and launched a short lived bid to seek the Libertarian nomination for Vice President. Former Massachusetts Governor William Weld would ultimately receive the Libertarian nomination. On July 21, 2016, Bentivolio announced he would seek a re-match with Trott in the 11th District, this time attempting to do so as an independent. Bentivolio submitted more than the minimum 3,000 signatures that are required to gain a spot on the November general election ballot as a non-party affiliated candidate and was placed on the ballot.

2018 congressional election
After David Trott retired, Bentivolio again filed to run in the eleventh district Republican primary. He was challenged by businesswoman and Michigan co-chair of Donald Trump's 2016 presidential campaign Lena Epstein, State Representative Klint Kesto, State Senator Mike Kowall and former State Senator, nominee for US Senate in 2002 and nominee for the ninth district in 2010 Rocky Raczkowski. Throughout the campaign, Bentivolio polled behind most candidates, and on election day Bentivolio finished last in the primary, drawing 9,799 votes, or 11.3%. Epstein won the nomination in a race ultimately won by Democrat Haley Stevens.

Political positions
Bentivolio describes himself as a conservative with libertarian ideals on most issues and has been endorsed by the Tea Party Express.  He strongly supports the right to bear arms.

He describes freedom of speech as "vital to our society." According to his campaign website, he opposes "any measures to regulate speech on the Internet, or to license and regulate the behavior of Internet service providers."

According to Young Americans for Liberty, he supports a non-interventionist foreign policy.

According to Electful.com, Bentivolio supports criminalization of abortion. Bentivolio's campaign website says that he opposes federal subsidies for abortion providers, foreign aid that "supports abortion in other nations" and requirements that religious institutions provide coverage for abortion as part of federally mandated health plans. Bentivolio's website also notes that he is endorsed by the anti-abortion group Right to Life Michigan.

He seeks to reduce regulation and bureaucracy, cut taxes, cut government spending, and discontinue government investment in some industries.

In response to a request from a concerned citizen in his district, Bentivolio promised to hold a hearing concerning the "chemtrails" conspiracy theory.

In a video published on August 23, 2013, from a town hall meeting in his district, Bentivolio said it would be a "dream come true" to submit a bill with articles of impeachment for President Barack Obama. Bentivolio admitted to not having any outright evidence and instead requesting the advice of "lawyers, [with] PhDs in history" to "Tell me how I can impeach the president of the United States."

During the United States federal government shutdown of 2013, Bentivolio was one of the 144 House Republicans who voted against legislation to end the government shutdown. In explaining his vote, he said that the new health care mandate should be delayed for individuals as it was for businesses.

U.S. House of Representatives
Bentivolio's two-year term began on January 3, 2013.

Legislation
As a Representative, Bentivolio sponsored 13 bills, including:
 H.R. 746, a bill to grant businesses a 6-month grace period before being subject to any government sanction or penalty, introduced February 15, 2013
 H.R. 939, a bill to prohibit the transfer of certain military equipment to the Egyptian government unless the Egyptian government combats terrorist groups, promotes religious and political freedoms, enforces access along the Sinai Peninsula, and is fully implementing the Egypt–Israel peace treaty, introduced March 4, 2013
 H.R. 1831, a bill to require bills and resolutions to contain a provision citing congressional authority, and to bar any vote from occurring if the full text of the bill or resolution has not been released publicly for at least a week, introduced May 6, 2013
 H.R. 3993, a bill to reduce the pay of members of Congress by 15% during any fiscal year in which the federal government has a budget deficit, introduced February 5, 2014
 H.R. 5121, a bill to prohibit U.S. Armed Forces from detaining a U.S. citizen or lawful resident alien of the United States who was captured, detained, or arrested in the United States, and to prohibit an authorization for the detention without charge or trial of a citizen or lawful permanent resident of the United States apprehended in the United States, introduced July 16, 2014
 H.R. 5479, a bill to require the public release of any method used to determine credit scores, introduced September 16, 2014
 H.R. 5779, a bill to allow for a $10,000 deduction in gross income each taxable year for certain expenses relating to attending a private school, introduced December 2, 2014

Committee assignments
 Committee on Oversight and Government Reform
 Subcommittee on National Security
 Subcommittee on Economic Growth, Job Creation and Regulatory Affairs
 Committee on Small Business
 Subcommittee on Contracting and Workforce
 Subcommittee on Investigations, Oversight and Regulations

Personal life
Bentivolio's wife Karen is a registered nurse. They have resided in Milford, Michigan since 1982 and live on a small farm raising reindeer trained to pull Santa's sleigh in various parades and special holiday events within Michigan.  They also maintain a small flock of chickens, a 25-hive apiary of honeybees, and a 115-vine vineyard.  Bentivolio is an avid sportsman and bass fisherman. He is a novice golfer and enjoys clay pigeon shooting. He is a Roman Catholic.

Filmography

Electoral history

2010

2012

2014

2016

2018

References

Further reading

External links

 
 

1951 births
Living people
20th-century American male actors
21st-century American politicians
American male film actors
American Roman Catholics
Catholic libertarians
Madonna University alumni
Marygrove College alumni
Michigan Independents
Michigan Libertarians
Michigan State University alumni
People from Milford, Michigan
Politicians from Detroit
Republican Party members of the United States House of Representatives from Michigan
United States Army personnel of the Gulf War
United States Army personnel of the Iraq War
United States Army personnel of the Vietnam War